William Pullman (born December 17, 1953) is an American actor. After graduating with a Master of Fine Arts degree in theater, he was an adjunct professor at Montana State University before deciding to pursue acting. He made his film debut in Ruthless People (1986), and starred in Spaceballs (1987), The Accidental Tourist (1988), Sleepless in Seattle (1993), While You Were Sleeping (1995), Casper (1995), Independence Day (1996), Lost Highway (1997), and Lake Placid (1999). He has appeared frequently on television, usually in TV films. Starting in the 2000s he has also acted in miniseries and regular series, such as Torchwood (2011), starring roles in 1600 Penn (2012–13) and The Sinner (2017–2021). In 2021, he had a recurring role in the miniseries Halston.

Pullman has also had a long stage acting career. He has appeared on Broadway several times, including in Edward Albee's The Goat, or Who Is Sylvia? in 2002.

Early life
Pullman was born in Hornell, New York, the son of James Pullman, a physician, and Johanna (née Blaas), a nurse.

After graduating from Hornell High School in 1971, he attended the State University of New York at Delhi (SUNY Delhi) and the State University of New York at Oneonta (SUNY Oneonta) in the 1970s. He eventually received his Master of Fine Arts degree from the University of Massachusetts Amherst. He taught theater at SUNY Delhi and was an adjunct professor at Montana State University's School of Film and Photography in Bozeman, Montana, where his students persuaded him to pursue film roles.

Career
During the 1980s, Pullman worked primarily with theater companies around New York and Los Angeles. His first prominent film role was in Ruthless People, starring Danny DeVito and Bette Midler. Other notable films included the lead in Spaceballs (1987), The Serpent and the Rainbow (with Zakes Mokae), and While You Were Sleeping (1995). In 1996, he played the President of the United States in the sci-fi film Independence Day. A year later he had a major role in Lost Highway (1997) and voiced Korso in the animated post-apocalyptic film Titan A.E. His more recent films have included The Grudge and Scary Movie 4. He also starred alongside Christian Bale in the musical Newsies.

From February 2002 until September 2002, Pullman starred with Mercedes Ruehl in Edward Albee's play The Goat, or Who Is Sylvia? on Broadway. It won the 2002 Tony Award for Best Play, the 2002 Drama Desk Award Outstanding New Play, and the 2003 Pulitzer Prize for Drama. Pullman was nominated for the 2002 Drama Desk Award Outstanding Actor in a Play.

He starred as Dr. Richard Massey in the miniseries Revelations and in Albee's play Peter and Jerry at off-Broadway's Second Stage Theatre in New York for which he received a second Drama Desk Award nomination for Outstanding Actor in a Play in 2008.

Pullman is also a creative writer. His first play, Expedition 6, is about the International Space Station mission Expedition 6, in orbit at the time the Space Shuttle Columbia was destroyed on reentry, grounding the U.S. space shuttle program and requiring the ISS crew to remain in orbit an additional two months. The play opened at San Francisco's Magic Theater in September 2007.

He also appeared in the Broadway production of David Mamet's Oleanna, co-starring Julia Stiles. It opened at the John Golden Theatre October 11, 2009 and closed on December 6, 2009 after 65 performances.

He is a jury member for the digital studio Filmaka, a platform for undiscovered filmmakers to show their work to industry professionals.

Pullman played Oswald Danes, a pedophile and child killer, in Torchwood: Miracle Day, the fourth series of the BBC/Starz Entertainment television show Torchwood (a spinoff to the BBC series Doctor Who), the former of which began airing in July 2011. For his performance as Danes, he received a Saturn Award nomination for Best Supporting Actor on Television.

From 2012 to 2013, Pullman portrayed the president of the United States in the television comedy series 1600 Penn. He played detective Harry Ambrose in the USA Network mystery series The Sinner, which premiered in 2017 and has aired for four seasons.

Personal life
Pullman is married to Tamara Hurwitz, a modern dancer. Their three children are actor Lewis Pullman, singer-songwriter Maesa Pullman, and Jack Pullman. 

At the age of 21, Pullman suffered a head injury when he fell while rehearsing a play, and lost his sense of smell and the feeling in his left elbow. He is an avid Buffalo Bills fan. He co-owns a cattle ranch with his brother in Montana, near the town of Whitehall, where he lives part-time. He also serves on the board of trustees at Alfred University and was awarded an honorary doctorate there on May 14, 2011. In 2018, he received an honorary doctorate from Montana State University, where he was formerly employed.

Filmography

Film

Television

Stage

Awards and nominations

References

External links

 
Bill Pullman at FEARnet

1953 births
20th-century American male actors
21st-century American male actors
American male film actors
American male stage actors
American male television actors
Living people
Male actors from New York (state)
Montana State University faculty
People from Glen Ellyn, Illinois
People from Hornell, New York
State University of New York at Oneonta alumni
State University of New York at Delhi alumni
University of Massachusetts Amherst alumni
State University of New York at Delhi faculty
People from Jefferson County, Montana